Ahmad Elrich (born 30 May 1981) is an Australian professional association footballer who plays as a right winger for Australian club Parramatta FC. Born in Australia to Lebanese parents, Elrich represented his native country internationally, both at youth and senior level.

Elrich played seventeen games for the Australia national soccer team and played for Fulham F.C. in the English Premier League. He is the older brother of professional football player Tarek Elrich.

Club career

Australia
Elrich began his professional career at the Parramatta Eagles, his home club, being born just west of the club's home ground.

At the end of his first season with the Eagles, he toured Lebanon with a team of Lebanese-Australians. He was offered a contract with Nejmeh SC in Beirut, but declined in favour of returning to Australia.

Returning to Australia he signed with new NSL club Parramatta Power in the club's inaugural squad. Elrich cemented a first-team spot as a free-flowing winger here, including a memorable 2003–04 season where he was one of the league's leading assist getters, and played in the Grand Final at just 22. His time at the Parramatta Power was cut short, as the club and NSL met its demise.

South Korea and Fulham
Elrich then moved to South Korean side Busan I'cons. After a protracted contract dispute that saw him on the sidelines for five months, he made his move to the English Premier League.

Elrich signed a 3-year deal with Fulham in the Summer of 2005 from K-League club Busan I'cons. He was loaned out to FC Lyn Oslo from April to May 2006.

After signing for Fulham and making his debut against Liverpool in a Premier League match, Elrich's first team appearances were few and far between, but despite signing a 3-year contract in 2006, his future at the club looked in doubt after not being given a squad number for the 2007–08 season and Fulham confirmed Elrich's departure on 4 September 2007.

Return to Australia
 
Elrich signed a contract with the Wellington Phoenix in the A-League as their marquee player on 21 September 2007. Elrich scored his first goal, in his first home game, for the Wellington Phoenix against Central Coast Mariners on 21 October 2007, which he described as the 'best goal of his career'. At the end of the 2007–08 season, Ahmad left the Wellington Phoenix to move back to Australia, moving to Central Coast Mariners to link up with several former Parramatta Power teammates. After limited appearances and poor form, he was released by the Central Coast Mariners at the end of the 2009–10 A-League season.

Comeback
Elrich returned to soccer to play for semi-professional team Rydalmere Lions FC in National Premier Leagues NSW 3 in 2017 after playing regional league soccer with Auburn District in 2016.

International career
Elrich represented Australia at the 2004 Summer Olympics. His inactivity for Fulham FC was seen as the key factor in him not being selected for the Australian World Cup squad. On 6 September 2006, Elrich suffered a serious knee injury whilst playing for Australia in an Asian Cup qualifier against Kuwait.

Personal life 
Elrich was born on 30 May 1981 to Lebanese parents Mahmoud and Ahmad. He also has a younger brother, Tarek, who also plays professional football.

In May 2011, Elrich was charged with a number of gun offences and possession of a drug after being pulled over on his motorcycle because of a faulty tail light. He was sentenced to four years and released on 12 October 2015.

Career statistics

International

International goals
Results list Australia's goal tally first.

Honours and achievements

International 
Australia
 OFC Nations Cup: 2004

Individual 
Awards
 Joe Marston Medal: 2003–2004 with Parramatta Power

References

External links
 
 
 
 Ahmad Elrich at ozfootball.net
 
 
 

1981 births
Living people
Prisoners and detainees of Australia
Australian people of Lebanese descent
Sportspeople of Lebanese descent
Association football wingers
Australia international soccer players
Australia youth international soccer players
Australia under-20 international soccer players
Parramatta Power players
Busan IPark players
Fulham F.C. players
Lyn Fotball players
Wellington Phoenix FC players
Central Coast Mariners FC players
National Soccer League (Australia) players
K League 1 players
Premier League players
Eliteserien players
A-League Men players
Australian expatriate soccer players
Expatriate association footballers in New Zealand
Expatriate footballers in South Korea
Expatriate footballers in England
Expatriate footballers in Norway
Australian expatriate sportspeople in New Zealand
Australian expatriate sportspeople in South Korea
Australian expatriate sportspeople in England
Australian expatriate sportspeople in Norway
2004 OFC Nations Cup players
2005 FIFA Confederations Cup players
Footballers at the 2004 Summer Olympics
Olympic soccer players of Australia
Soccer players from Sydney
Parramatta FC players
Marquee players (A-League Men)
Australian soccer players
Rydalmere Lions FC players
People from Parramatta